Sar Sardab-e Sofla (also Romanized as Sar Sardāb-e Soflá; also known as Sar Sardāb-e Pā'īn) is a village in Seyyedvaliyeddin Rural District, Sardasht District, Dezful County, Khuzestan Province, Iran. At the 2006 census, its population was 34, in 5 families.

References 

Populated places in Dezful County